"You Still Own Me" is a song originally recorded by Scottish-Canadian country music artist Johnny Reid. It was recorded on his 2005 album Born to Roll.

Emerson Drive version

Canadian country music band Emerson Drive recorded a cover of the song on their 2007 album Countrified. The band's cover version has been released as their third U.S. single from the album, and reached a peak of number 22 on the Billboard Hot Country Songs chart dated January 26, 2008, the song's twenty-sixth week on the charts.

Chart performance
"You Still Own Me" debuted at number 55 on the Hot Country Songs chart dated August 4, 2007. It entered the Top 40 in its eighth chart week, and peaked at number 22 on the country chart dated January 26, 2008.

Other versions
Ty Herndon recorded a version of the song for his 2007 album Right About Now.
John Berry included his version of the song on his 2008 album Those Were the Days.

References

2004 singles
2007 singles
Emerson Drive songs
Johnny Reid songs
Ty Herndon songs
John Berry (country singer) songs
Midas Records Nashville singles
Open Road Recordings singles
Songs written by Noah Gordon (singer)
2004 songs
Songs written by Johnny Reid